Graham Addley (born 1963) is a Canadian provincial politician. He was the New Democratic Party member of the Legislative Assembly of Saskatchewan for the constituency of Saskatoon Sutherland until he was defeated in the 2007 election by the Saskatchewan Party's Joceline Schriemer.

Addley was first elected to the Legislature in 1999, and served as Deputy Speaker and chair of the Committee of the Whole from May 2001 to October 2005. He co-authored "Press Councils and Democracy" which he presented to the 41st Canadian Regional Conference of the Commonwealth Parliamentary Association in New Brunswick in July 2002 and was subsequently published in the Parliamentary Review. Appointed in 2000 to the All Party Committee on Tobacco Control, Addley was instrumental in developing recommendations which transformed Saskatchewan's approach to tobacco control including the precedent setting tobacco display ban which eliminated the last legal avenue for tobacco companies to advertise to children. After the Supreme Court ruled in 2005 in Saskatchewan's favour, the law was emulated across the country and around the world. In 2006 the Lung Association of Saskatchewan presented Addley its Award of Merit for outstanding service in promoting lung health in Saskatchewan. Appointed Legislative Secretary to the Premier on Substance Abuse Prevention and Treatment in January 2005, his "Healthy Choices in a Healthy Community Report" resulted in the Premier's Project Hope strategy which was honoured by the Canadian Centre on Substance Abuse (CCSA) for leadership and commitment to the field of addiction. In October 2005 Addly was appointed to the Executive Council of Saskatchewan as Minister of Healthy Living Services and Minister Responsible for Seniors. In May 2007 his Cabinet duties were expanded to include Minister Responsible for Investment Saskatchewan Inc. and Minister Responsible for Information Services Corporation of Saskatchewan.

He is married with three children.

External links 
  the Lung Association of Saskatchewan 

Living people
1963 births
Saskatchewan New Democratic Party MLAs
21st-century Canadian politicians